P. Ramachandran (11 July 1921 – 23 May 2001) was an Indian politician and Member of the Legislative Assembly. In parliament he represented Tamil Nadu. He was also Governor of Kerala (1982–1988).

In the assembly he was elected from Peranamallur constituency as an Indian National Congress candidate in 1962. He was later elected to Lok Sabha from Chennai Central constituency as a Janata Party candidate in 1977.

Tamil Nadu Congress Committee President 
Ramachandran served as a President of Tamil Nadu Congress Committee.

See also 
 List of Governors of Kerala
 Ministry of Power

References

External links 
 GOVERNORS OF KERALA
 P. Ramachandran dead The Hindu
 KERALA LEGISLATURE - GOVERNORS

1921 births
2001 deaths
Indian National Congress politicians from Tamil Nadu
Janata Party politicians
Lok Sabha members from Tamil Nadu
India MPs 1977–1979
Governors of Kerala
Politicians from Chennai
Indian National Congress (Organisation) politicians
Ministers of Power of India
Madras MLAs 1957–1962
Madras MLAs 1962–1967